Yek Muki (also Romanized as Yek Mūkī) is a village in Kahnuk Rural District, Irandegan District, Khash County, Sistan and Baluchestan Province, Iran. At the 2006 census, its population was 38, in 10 families.

References 

Populated places in Khash County